Ludington is an English surname. It is the American variant to the name Luddington. Notable people with the surname include:

Charles Cameron Ludington, American professor 
Charles Townsend Ludington (1896–1968), American businessman and aviator
Harrison Ludington (1812–1891), American politician
Henry Ludington (1739–1817), American army commander and businessman
Jake Ludington (born 1973), American writer
James Ludington (1827–1891), American businessman 
Lewis Ludington (1786–1857), American businessman
Nelson Ludington (1818–1883), American businessman 
Ronald Ludington (1934–2020), American skater and coach
Sybil Ludington (1761–1839), American revolutionary figure

See also
Ludington (disambiguation)
Ludington family

English-language surnames